Cichoń is a surname. Notable people with the surname include:

 Adam Cichon (born 1975), Polish-born German footballer
 Aleksander Cichoń (born 1958), Polish wrestler
  (born 1953), Polish mathematician
 Przemysław Cichoń (born 1978), Polish footballer
 Thomas Cichon (born 1976), Polish-born German footballer and manager

See also
 
 Cichoń's diagram, named after Jacek Cichoń

Polish-language surnames